American Airlines Flight 444 was a scheduled American Airlines flight from Chicago to Washington, D.C.'s National Airport. On November 15, 1979, the Boeing 727 serving the flight was attacked by "the Unabomber", Ted Kaczynski, who sent the bomb in the mail and set it to detonate at a certain altitude.  The bomb partially detonated in the cargo hold and caused "a sucking explosion and a loss of pressure," which was then followed by large quantities of smoke filling the passenger cabin, forcing the pilots to make an emergency landing at Dulles International Airport.  Twelve passengers had to be treated afterward for smoke inhalation.

References

External links 

 

Failed airliner bombings
Unabomber targets
Airliner accidents and incidents in Washington, D.C.
Airliner accidents and incidents in Illinois
Failed terrorist attempts in the United States
444
Aviation accidents and incidents in the United States in 1979
1979 in Washington, D.C.
1979 in Illinois
Airliner bombings in the United States
Crimes in Illinois
Crimes in Washington, D.C.
November 1979 events in the United States
Terrorist incidents in the United States in 1979
Accidents and incidents involving the Boeing 727